Affton School District is a school district in Affton, Missouri, located within St. Louis County. Its schools include Affton Early Childhood, Mesnier Primary School, Gotsch Intermediate School, Merrill J. Rogers Middle School, and Affton High School.

History
The Affton School District, founded in 1855, offered its first high school courses in the basement of Mackenzie School in 1930. The first high school graduation was held in 1934. The original section of the now old Affton High School was completed in 1936. This building, located across the street from the current Affton High School, was used as the Sanders Work Activity Center, but has since been torn down and is now a senior-living facility. Several additions to the high school have added a new cafeteria, a second gym and a swimming pool, a new sports complex and a common area for student gatherings.

Operations
Students who are differently abled are referred to the Special School District of St. Louis County (SSD) facilities. Affton School District residents are zoned to Southview School (ages 5-21) in Sunset Hills.

References

School districts in Missouri
Education in St. Louis County, Missouri
1855 establishments in Missouri
School districts established in 1855